Townsville West was an electoral district of the Legislative Assembly in the Australian state of Queensland from 1972 to 1986.

It mostly covered the western suburbs of the North Queensland city of Townsville.

The seat was abolished in the 1985 redistribution, effective at the 1986 election.

Members for Townsville West

Election results

See also
 Electoral districts of Queensland
 Members of the Queensland Legislative Assembly by year
 :Category:Members of the Queensland Legislative Assembly by name

References

Former electoral districts of Queensland
1972 establishments in Australia
1986 disestablishments in Australia
Constituencies established in 1972
Constituencies disestablished in 1986